The Standard-Examiner is a daily morning newspaper published in Ogden, Utah, United States. With roughly 30,000 subscribers on Sunday and 25,000 daily, it is the third largest daily newspaper in terms of circulation in Utah, after The Salt Lake Tribune and the Deseret News. It was acquired by Sandusky Newspapers, Inc. of Sandusky, Ohio, on March 23, 1994.

History
The Standard-Examiner is Utah's third largest daily news source, serving Weber, Davis, Box Elder and Morgan counties for over 128 years. Every week, over 200,000 area residents read Standard-Examiner through print, online and mobile formats to stay informed on happenings in their local community and throughout the world.

The Standard-Examiner traces its roots to Jan. 1, 1888, when the first edition of the Ogden Standard rolled off the presses. In a small city that was tough on newspapers, it persevered. But in 1904, it met competition from the Ogden Examiner.

For 16 years, the Standard—owned by William Glasmann—and the Examiner sparred for readership. But on April 1, 1920, the two competitors merged, creating the Standard-Examiner.

For more than two generations, the Standard-Examiner kept its offices in the Kiesel Building, just west of 24th Street (SR-53) and Washington Boulevard (US-89). In 1961, the newspaper moved to 455 23rd Street, where it would remain for 39 years.

During that time, the newspaper, still owned by Glasmann's descendants, was sold to the Ohio-based Sandusky Newspaper Group. It is the largest-circulation newspaper owned by SNG.

In 2000, the Standard-Examiner moved to Business Depot Ogden, a business park that had once been Defense Depot Ogden. Besides new offices, a new $10 million printing press was installed. Historically an evening newspaper, the Standard-Examiner also switched to morning publication that year.

The Standard-Examiner reorganized its newsroom in August 2015 around a Real Time Desk, which breaks news online, curates standard.net and engages readers on social media.

In April 2018, the Provo Daily Herald announced that it was buying Standard-Examiner.

In mid-2018, The Ogden Newspapers Company bought out most of the Ogden Standard Examiner

Top of Utah
The "Top of Utah" is used to refer to the "northern part of the Beehive State, Davis, Weber, Box Elder, Morgan, Cache, and Rich counties." This term was coined by Standard-Examiner publisher Scott Trundle in the mid-1990s and used, as in a December 31, 2000, Ogden Standard-Examiner editorial, as "the six-county Top of Utah region."

Online archive
The Marriott Library at the University of Utah has begun digitizing early editions of the predecessor versions of the Standard-Examiner, including the Ogden Junction, the Ogden Herald, and the Ogden Standard.

See also
 List of newspapers in Utah

References

External links

 
 Digital Archives of the Ogden Standard-Examiner (Marriott Library, University of Utah)

Companies based in Utah
Mass media in Salt Lake City
Newspapers published in Utah
Companies based in Ogden, Utah
Ogden, Utah
1888 establishments in Utah Territory